The Industrial Promotion & Investment Corporation of Odisha Limited or IPICOL was incorporated on April 12, 1973 by the Government of Odisha to promote medium and large scale industries in the state by providing necessary support services including equity participation and long term financial assistance.

IPICOL has been designated as the State Level Nodal Agency (SLNA) under section 8 of Odisha Industries (Facilitation) Act, 2004 by Government of Odisha, Industries Department. Further, as per Industrial Policy Resolution (IPR), 2007 of Government of Odisha, IPICOL, as the SLNA has been further strengthened as Investment Promotion Agency (IPA) to function as an effective one stop shop for investors.

Key Activities
The main activity of IPCOL is to make Odisha an investment destination in the identified focus sectors. It also has to develop and maintain various apps, roadshows, events, exhibitions and print medias to bolster the investment scenario of the state.

Supporting Organizations 
 Agricultural Promotion and Investment Corporation Of Odisha Limited
 Industrial Development Corporation of Odisha Limited
 Odisha Film Development Corporation
 Odisha Industrial Infrastructure Development Corporation
 Odisha Small Industries Corporation
 Odisha State Financial Corporation

References

External links 
 Official Website of Industrial Promotion & Investment Corporation of Odisha Limited (IPICOL)

Economy of Odisha
State agencies of Odisha
State industrial development corporations of India
1973 establishments in Orissa
Indian companies established in 1973